Elphaba Thropp  is a fictional character in Wicked: The Life and Times of the Wicked Witch of the West by Gregory Maguire, as well as in the Broadway and West End adaptations, Wicked.

In the original 1900 L. Frank Baum book The Wonderful Wizard of Oz, the Wicked Witch of the West is unnamed and little is explained about her life. Elphaba is modeled after the Witch portrayed by Margaret Hamilton in the classic 1939 film The Wizard of Oz: green-skinned, clad entirely in black and wearing a tall peaked hat. Maguire formulated the name "Elphaba" from the phonetic pronunciation of Baum's initials — "L.F.B.".

Actresses who have portrayed Elphaba
The role was originated on Broadway and in London by Idina Menzel, who won the 2004 Tony Award for Best Actress in a Musical. The role is currently slated to be played by Cynthia Erivo in the upcoming film adaptation of the musical.

Actresses billed in the lead role in various productions include:

North America

Broadway 
 Idina Menzel (October 2003 — January 2005)
 Shoshana Bean (January 2005 — January 2006)
 Eden Espinosa (January — October 2006)
 Ana Gasteyer (October 2006 — January 2007)
 Julia Murney (January — October 2007)
 Stephanie J. Block (October 2007 — June 2008)
 Kerry Ellis (June — November 2008)
 Marcie Dodd (November 2008 — January 2009)
 Nicole Parker (January — July 2009)
 Dee Roscioli (July 2009 — March 2010)
 Mandy Gonzalez (March 2010 — January 2011)
 Teal Wicks (February — September 2011)
 Jackie Burns (September 2011 — January 2013; July 2017 — July 2018)
 Willemijn Verkaik (February — May 2013)
 Lindsay Mendez (May 2013 — February 2014)
 Christine Dwyer (February — December 2014)
 Caroline Bowman (December 2014 — September 2015)
 Rachel Tucker (September 2015 — July 2016)
 Jennifer DiNoia (July 2016 — July 2017)
 Jessica Vosk (July 2018 – May 2019)
 Hannah Corneau (May 2019 – February 2020)
 Lindsay Pearce (February – March 2020; September 2021 – May 2022)
 Talia Suskauer (May 2022 – March 2023)
 Alyssa Fox (March 2023 – Current)

1st U.S. National Tour (Emerald City Tour) 
 Kristy Cates (Temporary: March 2005)
 Stephanie J. Block (Original) (March 2005 - March 2006)
 Eden Espinosa (Temporary) (August - September 2005)
 Julia Murney (March - September 2006)
 Shoshana Bean (September - December 2006)
 Victoria Matlock (January - November 2007)
 Carmen Cusack (November 2007 - November 2008)
 Donna Vivino (November 2008 - July 2010)
 Jackie Burns (July 2010 - June 2011)
 Dee Roscioli (June - October 2011; September 2012 - April 2013; July 2013)
 Mamie Parris (October 2011 - May 2012)
 Nicole Parker (May - September 2012)
 Alison Luff (April 2013 - April 2014)
 Emma Hunton (April 2014 - February 2015)
 Jennifer DiNoia (February - March 2015)

2nd U.S. National Tour (Munchkinland Tour) 
 Marcie Dodd (March 2009 - April 2010)
 Vicki Noon (April 2010 - January 2011)
 Anne Brummel (January 2011 - April 2012)
 Christine Dwyer (May 2012 - March 2013)
 Jennifer DiNoia (April 2013 - March 2014)
 Laurel Harris (April 2014 - January 2015)
 Alyssa Fox (October 2014; January - December 2015)
 Emily Koch (December 2015 - September 2016)
 Jessica Vosk (September 2016 - September 2017)
 Jackie Burns (October 2018 - February 2019)
 Mariand Torres (February 2019 - September 2019)
 Talia Suskauer (September 2019 - March 2020; August 2021 - March 2022)
 Lissa deGuzman (March 2022 - Current)

Mexico City
 Danna Paola
 Ana Cecilia Anzaldúa

Chicago, Illinois
 Ana Gasteyer (June 2005 - January 2006)
 Kristy Cates (January - December 2006)
 Dee Roscioli (December 2006 - June 2008; August 2008 - January 2009)
 Lisa Brescia (June - August 2008)

Los Angeles, California
 Eden Espinosa (February - December 2007; October 2008 - January 2009)
 Caissie Levy (January - May 2008)
 Teal Wicks (May - October 2008)
 Raini Rodriguez (Knight Squad, March 2019)

San Francisco, California
 Teal Wicks (January 2009 - March 2009; June 2009 - February 2010)
 Vicki Noon (temporary; March 2009 - May 2009)
 Eden Espinosa (March - June 2010)
 Marcie Dodd (June - September 2010)

Europe
West End (London) Production
 Idina Menzel (September - December 2006) 
 Kerry Ellis (January 2007 - June 2008, December 2008 - May 2009, August - October 2014)
 Alexia Khadime (June - November 2008; May 2009 - March 2010; March 2023 - Current) 
 Rachel Tucker (March 2010 - October 2012; September 2016 - January 2017)
 Louise Dearman (October 2012 - November 2013)
 Willemijn Verkaik (November 2013 - July 2014; January - July 2017)
 Jennifer DiNoia (October 2014 - January 2015)
 Emma Hatton (February 2015 - September 2016)
 Alice Fearn (July 2017 - July 2019)
 Nikki Bentley (July 2019 - January 2020)
 Laura Pick (January 2020 - February 2022)
 Lucie Jones (February 2022 – March 2023)  

UK & Ireland Tour

 Nikki Davis-Jones (2013-2014)
 Ashleigh Gray (2014-2015)
 Amy Ross (2018-2019)
 Laura Pick  (2023-) performances of the 3rd UK tour to begin at the Edinburgh Playhouse from 7 December 2023

Stuttgart, Germany

 Willemijn Verkaik
 

Oberhausen, Germany

 Willemijn Verkaik (March 2010-August 2010; November 2010-February 2011)
  (August 2010-November 2010)
  (March 2011-September 2011)

Scheveningen, The Netherlands

 Willemijn Verkaik
 Renée van Wegberg (Alternate)

Asia Pacific 

Tokyo, Japan
 Hamada Megumi
 Higuchi Asami
 Imai Minori
 Ebata Masae

Melbourne, Australia
 Amanda Harrison (2008-2009; 2009)
 Jemma Rix (2009-August 2009; May 2014 - present)

Sydney, Australia
 Amanda Harrison (September 2009-November 2009)
 Jemma Rix (November 2009-September 2010 and May 2014 - present)
 Pippa Grandison (December 2009-May 2010)
 Patrice Tipoki (May 2010-September 2010)
 Laura Bunting

Osaka, Japan
 Ebata Masae
 Kimura Chiaki
 Higuchi Asami
 Okamura Minami

Brisbane, Australia
 Jemma Rix

Auckland, New Zealand
 Jemma Rix

Fukuoka, Japan
 Ebata Masae
Seoul, South Korea

 Jemma Rix (December 2011 - October 2012)
 Jennifer DiNoia (Alternate Elphaba, May 2012 - October 2012)
 Son Seung-yeon (February 2021 - May 2021)
 Ock Joo-hyun (February 2021 - May 2021)
Both actors in the 2021 production shared performances of the role

References

Characters in Wicked
Fictional activists
Literary characters introduced in 1995
Fictional characters with precognition
Female literary villains
Fictional kidnappers
Fictional nobility
Oz (franchise) witches
Characters in American novels of the 20th century
Fictional offspring of rape
Female characters in musical theatre